Madame Wants No Children (German: Madame wünscht keine Kinder) is a 1933 Austrian-German comedy film directed by Hans Steinhoff and starring Liane Haid, Georg Alexander and Lucie Mannheim. It is a remake of the 1926 silent film Madame Wants No Children.

It was shot at the Sievering Studios in Vienna. The film's sets were designed by the art directors Otto Erdmann, Hans Sohnle and Emil Stepanek.

Cast
Liane Haid as Madelaine Wengert  
Georg Alexander as Dr. Felix Rainer 
Lucie Mannheim as Luise  
Otto Wallburg as Herr Balsam 
Erika Glässner as Frau Wengert  
Willy Stettner as Adolf  
Hans Moser as Schlafwagenschaffner

References

External links

1933 comedy films
Austrian comedy films
Films of the Weimar Republic
German comedy films
Films directed by Hans Steinhoff
Austrian multilingual films
Remakes of German films
Sound film remakes of silent films
Films scored by Bronisław Kaper
Films shot at Sievering Studios
Tobis Film films
Austrian black-and-white films
German black-and-white films
German multilingual films
Films scored by Hans J. Salter
1933 multilingual films
1930s German films